Poa pratensis, commonly known as Kentucky bluegrass (or blue grass), smooth meadow-grass, or common meadow-grass, is a perennial species of grass native to practically all of Europe, North Asia and the mountains of Algeria and Morocco. Although the species is spread over all of the cool, humid parts of the United States, it is not native to North America. The Spanish Empire brought the seeds of Kentucky bluegrass to the New World in mixtures with other grasses. In its native range, Poa pratensis forms a valuable pasture plant, characteristic of well-drained, fertile soil. It is also used for making lawns in parks and gardens and has established itself as a common invasive weed across cool moist temperate climates like the Pacific Northwest and the Northeastern United States. When found on native grasslands in Canada, for example, it is considered an unwelcome exotic plant, and is indicative of a disturbed and degraded landscape.

Taxonomy

Poa pratensis is the type species of the grass family Poaceae.

There are two ill-defined subspecies:
Poa pratensis subsp. pratensis – temperate regions
Poa pratensis subsp. colpodea – Arctic

Description
They are in flower from May to July, compared to annual meadowgrass (Poa annua) which is in flower for eight months of the year. Poa pratensis has a fairly prominent mid-vein (center of the blade).

The ligule is extremely short and square-ended, making a contrast with annual meadowgrass (Poa annua) and rough meadowgrass (Poa trivialis) in which it is silvery and pointed. The Kentucky bluegrass is a dark green/blue compared to the apple-green color of Poa annua and Poa trivialis.

The rootstock is creeping, with runners (rhizomes). The broad, blunt leaves tend to spread at the base, forming close mats.

Ecology

Poa pratensis is among the food plants of the caterpillars of the meadow brown (Maniola jurtina), gatekeeper (Pyronia tithonus), and pepper-and-salt skipper butterflies; the common sun beetle (Amara aenea) (adults feed on the developing seeds), Eupelix cuspidata of the leafhopper family, and Myrmus miriformis, a grassbug (feeds on young blades and developing seeds).

Poa pratensis is host to a number of fungi, including Claviceps purpurea, which causes ergotism when consumed, Drechslera poae, Epichloë typhina, Phaeoseptoria poae, Puccinia brachypodii var. poae-nemoralis, Stagonospora montagnei, Stagonospora nodorum and Wojnowicia hirta.

Cultivation and production
The Central Kentucky Blue Grass Seed Company Building is on the National Register of Historic Places. Since the 1950s and early 1960s, 90% of Kentucky bluegrass seed in the United States has been produced on specialist farms in Idaho, Oregon and Washington.

During the 1990s botanists began experimenting with hybrids of Poa pratensis and Texas bluegrass (P. arachnifera), with the goal of creating a drought and heat-resistant lawn grass. In warm climates, such hybrids may remain green year-round.

Bella Bluegrass is a brand-named dwarf variant of Poa pratentis developed by the University of Nebraska. It has relatively deep roots and propagates relatively rapidly horizontally from its root system but grows to only  in above-ground height, basically eliminating the need for mowing lawns that use it. It cannot be reproduced by seed and thus depends on sod plugs or sprigging for its production.

NFL playing surfaces

Lambeau Field in Green Bay, WI
FirstEnergy Stadium in Cleveland, Ohio
Empower Field at Mile High in Denver, Colorado
Acrisure Stadium in Pittsburgh, Pennsylvania

MLB playing surfaces

Yankee Stadium in Bronx, NY
Oriole Park at Camden Yards in Baltimore, MD
Progressive Field in Cleveland, OH
Angel Stadium in Anaheim, CA
Busch Stadium in St.Louis, MO
Citizens Bank Park in Philadelphia, PA
American Family Field in Milwaukee, WI
Nationals Park in Washington, D.C.
Citi Field in Queens, NY
Comerica Park in Detroit, MI
Guaranteed Rate Field in Chicago, IL
Target Field in Minneapolis, MN
PNC Park in Pittsburgh, PA
Fenway Park in Boston, MA
Oakland Coliseum in Oakland, CA
Coors Field in Denver, CO (Kentucky Bluegrass/Perennial Ryegrass Blend)
T-Mobile Park in Seattle, WA (Kentucky Bluegrass/Perennial Ryegrass Blend)
Great American Ball Park in Cincinnati, OH (Kentucky Bluegrass Blend)
Wrigley Field in Chicago, IL (Kentucky Bluegrass/Clover Blend)
Kauffman Stadium in Kansas City, MO (Kentucky Bluegrass/Perennial Ryegrass Blend)

Gallery

References

Further reading
Flora Europaea: Poa pratensis
European Poa Database
Horticultural information on this turfgrass; growing it in the home garden * The Observers Book of Grasses, Sedges and Rushes. Frances Rose. pages 42–43
PennState Extension Kentucky Bluegrass Facts and Identification 
Kew gardens grass database

External links 
 

Cosmopolitan species
Grasses of Africa
Grasses of Asia
Grasses of Europe
Grasses of North America
Lawn grasses
Plants described in 1753
pratensis
Taxa named by Carl Linnaeus